Saxpartyfavoriter is a compilation album by Ingmar Nordströms, released 28 February 2007. The album consists of three newly-recorded songs, among them an instrumental version of "Gabriellas sång". Topping the Swedish albums chart, it became the band's first number-one album in Sweden, nearly 16 years following the mid-December 1991 band breakup.

Track listing
Gabriellas sång
The Elephant Song
Stardust
I Just Called to Say I Love You
Can't smile without you
Ännu doftar kärlek
Vi möts igen
Over the Rainbow
Sound of Music
Dance in the Old-Fashioned Way
Chansson d'amour
Ein bisschen Frieden
Ballade pour Adeline
Lili Marlene
I Left My Heart in San Francisco
Låt det svänga (La det swinge)
Edelweiss
Smile
As Time Goes By
Moonlight Serenade
Guldet blev till sand
Gösta Gigolo (Schöner Gigolo, armer Gigolo)
Dag efter dag
Mot alla vindar
Power of Love
You Raise Me Up
Moon River
Café le Swing
O mein papa
In the Mood
En månskenspromenad
Scarlet Ribbons
Thore Ehrling
Only Love
Rara underbara Katarina
Tomelilla 6-5000
Melodi nostalgi
För alltid och evigt
What a Wonderful World
Vår sista dans

Charts

References 

2007 compilation albums
Ingmar Nordströms albums
Compilation albums by Swedish artists